Crawford College, Lonehill is an independent school in Lone Hill (City of Johannesburg Metropolitan Municipality), Gauteng, South Africa. The schools which comprise the Crawford Collection constitute the largest single private school organisation in South Africa.

References

Private schools in Gauteng
Schools in Johannesburg